Carthage R-9 School District is a school district headquartered in Carthage, Missouri.

Schools
Secondary:
 Carthage High School
 Carthage Technical Center
 Carthage Junior High School
 Carthage 6th Grade Center

Primary:
 Carthage Intermediate Center
 Columbian Elementary School
 Fairview Elementary School
 Pleasant Valley Elementary School
 Steadley Elementary School
 Mark Twain Elementary School

Preschool:
 Early Childhood Center

References

External links
 

School districts in Missouri
Education in Jasper County, Missouri